The Chess Federation of Pakistan is national governing body to promote and develop chess in Pakistan. It was established in 1957, and joined FIDE in 1973.

Mr. Hanif Qureshi is the current President of the Federation, having been elected unanimously in June 2022.

It organizes the Pakistani Chess Championship and other local tournaments.

Affiliations 
The Chess Federation of Pakistan is affiliated with:

 FIDE
 Asian Chess Federation
 Commonwealth Chess Association
 Pakistan Sports Board

Affiliated associations 
The following bodies are associated with the CFP:

 Azad Kashmir Chess Association
 Balochistan Chess Association
 Gilgit Baltistan Chess Association
 Islamabad Chess Association
 Khyber Pakhtunkhwa Chess Association
 Punjab Chess Association
 Sindh Chess Association

References

External links
 

Pakistan
Chess in Pakistan
Sports governing bodies in Pakistan
1957 establishments in Pakistan
Sports organizations established in 1957
Chess organizations
1957 in chess